The Menard engine was a modified Buick V6 engine designed for the newly formed Indy Racing League by John Menard, the owner of Team Menard. The engine only lasted through 1996, the IRL's only season without its own unique chassis and engine combination. Before being used in the IRL, the Menard engine was used almost exclusively in the Indianapolis 500, with its first appearance being in the 1993 race. Menard engines powered many future IRL drivers such as Scott Brayton, Eddie Cheever Jr., Arie Luyendyk, and Buddy Lazier in various Indianapolis 500s before the IRL was conceived.

Menard engines did not win any races in the short 1996 season, but won the pole at Indianapolis with Brayton. When Ongais, as a replacement driver, was moved to the back of the field, fellow Menard driver Tony Stewart inherited the pole position.

The engine's best 1996 finish was 2nd at Disney World, in the league's inaugural race, with Tony Stewart driving. Its best driver overall was also Stewart, who finished 8th in the series standings that year.

Menard engines were only permitted for the first two races of the 1996-97 season, the last two run with old CART equipment. The best finish any Menard driver could muster in the old equipment was 10th place at New Hampshire by Paul, who was ten laps off the pace. Eventual season champion Stewart failed to finish his last two races in the old equipment, dropping out with electrical problems at New Hampshire despite leading 165 laps and crashing at Las Vegas.

Applications
Lola T93/00 
Lola T94/00
Lola T95/00

References

Engines by model
Gasoline engines by model
Buick engines
IndyCar Series
V6 engines